Xeltek is an American developer and manufacturer of device programming systems for programmable integrated circuits, headquartered in Silicon Valley, California. The main manufacturing facilities of the company are located in Nanjing, China and a smaller branch is located in Seoul, South Korea to support with R&D projects.

History 
Initially, the company was founded in South Korea in 1985 by Soonam Kim, under the name of Zeus Computer. In 1991, the company moved to Silicon Valley, California and changed its name to Xeltek. The first programmer device that was manufactured by the company was UniPro.

With the launch of SuperPro 2000, the company introduced stand-alone programming to the universal programmer industry in the year of 2000. Stand-alone programming is an application that allows the user to compile supported IC devices on a PC-independent platform through the help of an LCD screen that is mounted on a programming unit.

Xeltek has been business partners with Digi-Key since December, 2013 and Newark since May, 2014.

Product Range 
Today, many programmable electronic devices are commonly categorized as Flash Memory, Microcontrollers and Programmable Logic Devices. Most of the device programmers from Xeltek are referred as universal programmers due to the support of many programmable devices. The company's products can be categorized as below:          
     
 In-Circuit/In-System Programmers (ISP) A technique where a programmable device is configured after it is placed in a circuit board.
 Production Programmers: Programmers for high volume production programming as electronics manufacturers and programming centers.
 Universal Programmers: Single-site programmers for developers, small manufacturers, universities and personal use.
 Specialized Programmers: Single-site programmers for a wide variety of users from hobbyists to professionals.
 Automated Programmers: Designed for manufacturing large-scale electronics. It uses an industrial personal computer (with control card inside), servo system and vision system mode for chip placement, programming, and packaging programmable devices automatically.
 Programming Adapters: Universal adapters are designed to support the latest surface mount devices for every package type.

References 

Companies based in Silicon Valley
Technology companies established in 1985
Electronics companies of the United States
1985 establishments in California